The black Sumatran langur (Presbytis sumatrana) is a species of monkey in the family Cercopithecidae.  It was formerly considered a subspecies of the Sumatran surili, Presbytis melalophos (as Presbytis melalophos sumatrana) but genetic analysis revealed that these are separate species.  The black Sumatran langur is native to the island of Sumatra in Indonesia.  It is listed as endangered by the IUCN due primarily to deforestation, and also due to animals taken for pets.

References

Presbytis
Primates of Indonesia
Endemic fauna of Sumatra
Taxa named by Salomon Müller
Taxa named by Hermann Schlegel
Endangered fauna of Asia
Mammals described in 1841